"Tiny Dancer (Hold Me Closer)" is a song by British rapper Ironik featuring fellow British rapper Chipmunk, from his debut album No Point in Wasting Tears, released on 11 May 2009. The song heavily samples Elton John's 1972 single "Tiny Dancer".

Music video
The video features both Ironik and Chipmunk while Elton John is played on TV screens in the background. The video is completely black and white. It begins with Ironik and Chipmunk walking down a hotel corridor in suits on the way to their room. They knock on their room and are let in by a woman dressed in bondage and stockings. The video unfolds with Ironik and Chipmunk dancing with the females and flirting.

Formats track listing
CD single
"Tiny Dancer (Hold Me Closer)" (Radio edit) – 3:23
"Tiny Dancer (Hold Me Closer)" (Fraser T Smith remix) – 3:18

Digital download
"Tiny Dancer (Hold Me Closer)" (Radio edit) – 3:23
"Tiny Dancer (Hold Me Closer)" (TreMoreFire remix) – 6:18
"Tiny Dancer (Hold Me Closer)" (TRC remix) – 4:35
"Tiny Dancer (Hold Me Closer)" (Fraser T Smith remix) – 3:18

Charts and certifications

Weekly charts

Year-end charts

Certifications

Release history

References

2008 songs
2009 singles
Ironik songs
Chipmunk (rapper) songs
Elton John songs
Songs with music by Elton John
Songs with lyrics by Bernie Taupin
Songs written by Ironik